New Berlin Presbyterian Church, also known as New Berlin Community Center, is a historic Presbyterian church located at Vine and High Streets in New Berlin, Union County, Pennsylvania. It was built in 1843, and is a one-story, brick building, three bays wide and four bays deep, in the Greek Revival style. It features a portico supported by four Doric order columns and an octagonal cupola. It has been used as a community center since 1933.

It was listed on the National Register of Historic Places in 1972.

References

Churches on the National Register of Historic Places in Pennsylvania
Greek Revival church buildings in Pennsylvania
Churches completed in 1843
19th-century Presbyterian church buildings in the United States
Churches in Union County, Pennsylvania
Presbyterian churches in Pennsylvania
1843 establishments in Pennsylvania
National Register of Historic Places in Union County, Pennsylvania